Vuhred is a village on the right bank of the Drava River in the Municipality of Radlje ob Dravi in Slovenia.

The parish church in the settlement is dedicated to Saint Lawrence and belongs to the Roman Catholic Archdiocese of Maribor. It was built in 1884 on the foundations of a 17th-century church.

References

External links

Vuhred on Geopedia

Populated places in the Municipality of Radlje ob Dravi